South Edmonton station, known as Strathcona station prior to 1932, was built by the Calgary and Edmonton Railway in what was then the City of Strathcona, Alberta. Construction on the station was started in 1907, completed in 1908, and expanded in 1910.

The building was initially the northern terminus of the Calgary and Edmonton Railway serving Strathcona and Edmonton, although Canadian Pacific later expanded that line north across the North Saskatchewan River via the High Level Bridge into Edmonton proper.  The building was designated a Canadian Heritage Railway Station in 1991, when it was still owned by CP and therefore subject to federal regulation.  After being sold by CP it was designated a Municipal Historic Resource in 2003, and a Provincial Historic Resource in 2004.

From 1998 to 2010 the building was home to the Iron Horse Night Club, one of Edmonton's largest nightclubs, with two levels, eights bars, four rooms, a dance floor, and a stage; it hosted over 1,000 people on an average night.

Previous station in Strathcona 
The 1908 station was the second in Strathcona. The original 1891 station was demolished after this bigger station opened; however, a replica is now in the Calgary & Edmonton Railway Station Museum located at present day 10447 86 Avenue, four blocks north of the 1908 station.

References 

Canadian Pacific Railway stations in Alberta
Railway stations in Canada opened in 1908
Disused railway stations in Canada
Designated Heritage Railway Stations in Alberta
Provincial Historic Resources in Edmonton
Municipal Historic Resources of Edmonton
Tourist attractions in Edmonton
Music venues in Edmonton
1908 establishments in Alberta
Railway stations closed in 1985